The American Iranian Council (AIC) was formed in 1990 as a US-based bi-partisan think tank focused upon promoting better relations between the United States and Iran.  Former United States Secretary of State Cyrus Vance was the original honorary Chair of the organization. The AIC is an academic research and education organization that is focused upon improving the dialogue between two countries that often fail to take into account misperceptions, misunderstandings, and mischaracterizations.  The AIC seeks to help policy makers as well as concerned citizens become better aware of the interests in common to both countries.

Goals and mission
The AIC is designated as a 501(c)(3) non-profit, non-partisan, non-political, non-sectarian organization that is headquartered in Princeton, New Jersey. The AIC is generally focused upon working at the national and international levels of public policy, it is also increasingly involved in helping Iranian-American citizens in the United States to have their voices and concerns articulated and heard.

The AIC is guided by its core values – (i.) truth, (ii.) understanding, (iii.) dialogue and (iv.) participation – for an organization to promote and protect those values, the AIC helps turn these into more specific principles.  The organization believes in intellectual and practical rigor, a free and open and nonpartisan inquiry, full accountability and transparency, fair and balanced treatment of issues, the enhancement of a public-service ethic, broad participation of those who wish to be involved, and the promotion of common ground and mutual interests.

Achievements
The AIC was granted permission by the U.S. government to open an office in Iran. The AIC will be the only U.S.-based peace and conflict resolution Non-Governmental Organization (NGO) operating in Iran.  The AIC has hosted members of both political parties in the United States at its meetings.  Most recently, Senator Chuck Hagel and Congressman Dennis Kucinich have been involved in helping to move the U.S. and Iran away from armed conflict. The past Iranian Ambassador to the U.N., Javad Zarif, and the present Ambassador, Mohammad Khazaee, have both worked with the AIC.

In 2007, the AIC helped to arrange a meeting between President Mahmoud Ahmadinejad of Iran and U.S. academics, business leaders and members of the media.  The difficulties and problems in the ongoing relationship between the two countries was the primary topic of the discussion.

The AIC has announced that it is planning a meeting with Mohammad Khazaee, Iranian Ambassador to the United Nations.

Ali Shakeri, founding member of the University of California-Irvine Center for Peacebuilding in Los Angeles, called the AIC on Tuesday, October 2, 2007 to thank the AIC and its members for diplomatic actions taken to gain his release from prison in Iran. Mr. Shakeri has worked with and supported the activities of the AIC for many years. Shakeri had been unlawfully detained in Iran's notorious Evin Prison on charges of security violations since May 2007.

Leadership
The AIC has a prominent board which includes many of the top academics, diplomats, and business leaders.  AIC's honorary board includes  secretary Donna Shalala, and its board of directors is composed of Thomas R. Pickering, former Senator J Bennet Johnson, former Vice-Chairman of Chevron Richard Matzke, Dr. Fereidun Feksharaki President of FACTS, and Professor Hooshang Amirahmadi of Rutgers University, Ambassador Sargent Shriver, R.K. Ramazani, Ambassador Robert H. Pelletreau, Ambassador Chas W. Freeman, Judith Kipper, Roy Mottahedeh.

External links
 AIC official website
 PBS FRONTLINE press release
 Iraq in U.S.-Iranian Relations

Iranian-American organizations
Foreign policy and strategy think tanks in the United States
Non-profit organizations based in Princeton, New Jersey
United States friendship associations
1997 establishments in New Jersey
Think tanks established in 1997